Following is a list of battles and operations in the 1948 Palestine war.

Operations in the 1947–1948 inter-communal war in Palestine

Arms acquisitions
Following is a list of operations undertaken by the Yishuv and later Israel to acquire munitions abroad.

First stage
Following is a list of operations between May 15, 1948—the Arab invasion of Palestine—and June 11, 1948—the first truce of the war.

Battles of the Ten Days and second truce
Following is a list of battles and operations between the first and second truces of the war—July 8, 1948—July 18, 1948. This period was named "Battles of the Ten Days" in Israel. Also listed are Israeli operations during the second truce.

Final stage
Following is a list of battles and operations from the second truce of the war up to the 1949 Armistice Agreements.

See also
 1947–48 Civil War in Mandatory Palestine
 1948 Arab–Israeli War
 Killings and massacres during the 1948 Palestine War
 Depopulated Palestinian locations in Israel

Notes

Bibliography

 

Military operations in the 1948 Arab-Israeli war